Poland Spring is a brand of bottled water, produced in Poland, Maine. It is named after the original natural spring in the town of Poland, Maine it was drawn from. Today it is a subsidiary of BlueTriton Brands, formerly Nestlé Waters North America, and sold in the United States. The spring was first exploited commercially in 1859 by Hiram W. Ricker, owner of a nearby inn. Contemporary demand is so great the brand's water is derived from multiple sources in the state of Maine including Poland Spring and Garden Spring in Poland, Maine, Clear Spring in Hollis, Evergreen Spring in Fryeburg, Spruce Spring in Pierce Pond Township, White Cedar Spring in Dallas Plantation, and Bradbury Spring in Kingfield, and Cold Springs in Denmark. 

Poland Spring was the top-selling spring water brand in America in 2006. In 2007, the Poland Spring brand adopted a bottle using 30% less plastic, as did the other Nestlé Waters North America brands.

History
The spring dates back to the late 18th century. In 1797, The Wentworth Ricker Inn opened at the homestead of Jabez Ricker. In 1844, Jabez's grandson, Hiram W. Ricker claimed that spring water from the property cured him of chronic dyspepsia. In 1861, the inn was enlarged and renamed The Mansion House. The inn had grown to a resort, and his discussions with guests led them to also praise the drinking water. In this period, it was quite fashionable to "take the waters" for almost all illnesses, causing an uptick in business. The Rickers soon began bottling the water. Expanded again into an extravagant resort that locals dubbed "Ricker's Folly", the inn was renamed the Poland Spring House and opened On July 4, 1876. The inn remained a significant resort into the early 20th century, but the Ricker family lost control of the company during the 1930s. A resort still operates on the site.

Poland Spring operated independently since its inception until it was purchased by the Perrier Water Company in 1980. In 1992 Nestle acquired Poland Spring when it took over the Perrier company. In March 2021, Nestle completed a $4.3 billion deal selling its North American bottled water brands, including Poland Spring, to two private-equity firms.

Water sales

Today Poland Spring sells the majority of its water in portable 8, 12, and 20 oz bottles; 500 ml, 700 ml, 1 L, and 1.5 L bottles, and also  larger 5 gallon bottles usable in office or in home water dispensers. Smaller 3 L, 1 gallon and 2.5 gallon bottles are also available for sale in most supermarkets, and for home delivery in the Northeastern United States. Other varieties of Poland Spring include sparkling, lemon, lime, and distilled. They are also the producers of the Aquapod line of products.

All Poland Spring products are sold in plastic bottles, for both safety and economic reasons. Today, no portable Poland Spring bottles are made from the number "7" polycarbonate plastic that contains Bisphenol-A (BPA). The large 5-gallon bottles are made of number "1" plastic and are also BPA-free, while the 3-gallon bottles are made of number "7" plastic and may contain trace levels of BPA. Bottles made of PETE, which do not contain BPA (number "1" or "2" or "4" on bottom), started to appear in 2013; in some areas one may have only these bottles. They can be recognized by the different handle design (separate piece of plastic rather than a continuous molded element).

In the summer of 2005, Poland Spring changed the color of its 1-gallon bottle cap from dark green to clear.  The reason for the color change was to remove the dye from the cap, which is more suitable for the recycling stream.  Poland Spring later changed to a lighter bottle called the Eco-Shape which uses 30 percent less plastic. The new style made its debút in November 2007.

Controversies

Several towns in Maine have objected to the business practices of Poland Spring and its parent company Nestlé. In some towns, such as Fryeburg, Maine, Poland Spring actually buys the water (110 million gallons of water from Fryeburg a year) from another company, the Fryeburg Water Co., and ships it to the Poland Spring bottling plant in Poland Spring. However, Fryeburg Water Co. also sells water to the town of Fryeburg.

The town of Fryeburg began to question the amount of water the company was selling to Poland Spring. In 2004, the town's water stopped temporarily because of a pump failure, but Poland Spring's operations were able to continue. In 2004 the group H2O for ME began gathering support to create a tax on water drawn for commercial purposes. Poland Spring claimed the tax would force the company into bankruptcy.  State legislator Jim Wilfong proposed a 20 cent per gallon tax be allowed to be voted on in a referendum, but the measure was defeated. In April of 2019, the Maine Committee on Taxation considered a bill which would impose a 12 cents a gallon tax on companies that extract more than 1.5 million gallons for commercial bottling. Poland Spring, extracting approximately 950 million gallons per year, would have been the only company affected by the tax. In May of 2019 the committee voted, 9–2, against the bill, making it unlikely any tax would be enacted in the foreseeable future.

The town of Sterling, Massachusetts, is attempting to prevent Poland Spring (Nestlé) from pumping spring water from conservation restricted town land. Nestlé Waters North America (NWNA) has responded to an RFP issued by the Town of Clinton to purchase the Town of Clinton's Wekepeke aquifer water rights located in Sterling.

In June 2003, Poland Spring was sued for false advertising in a class action lawsuit charging that their water that supposedly comes from springs, is in fact heavily treated common ground water. The suit also states, hydro-geologists hired by Nestlé found that another current source for Poland Spring water near the original site stands over a former trash and refuse dump, and below an illegal disposal site where human sewage was sprayed as fertilizer for many years. The suit was settled in September 2003, with the company not admitting to the allegations, but agreeing to pay $10 million in charity donations and discounts over the next 5 years. Nestlé continues to sell the same Maine water under the Poland Spring name.

In August 2017, a class-action lawsuit was filed in Connecticut alleging that "Not one drop of Poland Spring Water emanates from a water source that complies with the Food and Drug Administration definition of 'spring water'. The famous Poland Spring in Poland Spring, Maine, which defendant's labels claim is a source of Poland Spring Water, ran dry nearly 50 years ago." A Poland Spring spokeswoman responded that "Poland Spring is 100 percent spring water. The claims made in the lawsuit are without merit and an obvious attempt to manipulate the legal system for personal gain." Scientist Peter Gleick said that "Most of Nestle's waters are pumped from the ground, but the bigger issue that the regulatory definition of what really counts as spring water is really weak. No one is really looking over the shoulders of the bottled water companies."

In March 2019, the district court judge dismissed the claims in the class-action lawsuit in Vermont out of the eleven northeastern states in favor of Nestle. The case will go forward in the state subclasses of the lawsuit in Maine, Connecticut, Massachusetts, New Hampshire, New Jersey, New York, Pennsylvania, Maryland, Delaware, and Rhode Island.

See also
 Poland Spring Bottling Plant and Spring House

References

Bottled water brands
BlueTriton brands
1845 establishments in Maine
Food and drink companies established in 1845
Drink companies of the United States
Food and drink companies based in Maine